William Michael Haley is a commissioned officer in the South Carolina Army National Guard who served as the First Gentleman of South Carolina from 2011 to 2017. He was the first man to hold the position.

He is the husband of former United States Ambassador to the United Nations and former Governor of South Carolina Nikki Haley.

Career

Military service
Haley is an officer with the South Carolina Army National Guard and specializes in Security Cooperation.

In January 2012, Haley shipped out for a year-long tour of duty in Afghanistan as a captain in the South Carolina Army National Guard.  The unit served in Helmand Province as an Agribusiness Development Team helping Afghan farmers improve farming techniques and develop cash crops to replace opium poppies. Haley served as a liaison between the military and civilian authorities.  He is thought to have been the first spouse of a governor to serve on active duty in a war zone.

Marines serving with Haley in Helmand Province nicknamed him FGOSC (First Gentleman of South Carolina).

First Gentleman of South Carolina
Since Haley is the first person to become First Gentleman of South Carolina, and because there have only been 15 First Gentlemen in U.S. history, including the five men in that role as of 2015, there was speculation about what his role would be. Haley chaired the foundation that oversees the preservation and management of the South Carolina Governor's Mansion in Columbia.

Stand for America
Haley is listed as president of Stand for America, a policy and media organization that Nikki Haley started after leaving her position as UN ambassador. Internal Revenue Service paperwork from 2019 indicates that Michael Haley worked 40 hours per week at the New York-based organization and received no compensation.

Personal life
Born as William Michael Haley, Haley was known as William or Bill Haley. When he met Nikki Haley, she didn't think he looked like a "Bill" and started calling him by his middle name, Michael.

Originally from Ohio, Haley entered a foster home at the age of three and was adopted by Bill and Carole Haley at the age of 4.

Haley and Nikki Randhawa met in 1989 as undergraduates at Clemson University.  While Nikki Haley is a Clemson graduate, Michael graduated from the University of North Carolina at Charlotte with a degree in business administration. Haley is a graduate of Hilton Head Preparatory School.

Michael and Nikki Haley were married in 1996 in two ceremonies, a Sikh ceremony, and a ceremony at St. Andrew's by-the-Sea, the Methodist church in Hilton Head, where Haley's parents, Carole and Bill, have lived since retiring from jobs in Cleveland, Ohio when Michael was in the ninth grade. Before retiring to Hilton Head, Bill Haley was director of a steel manufacturing plant and Carole Haley taught school. 

Haley worked at Exotica International, an upscale men's and women's clothing store owned by his mother-in-law. Following that period, he worked for 8 years as a federal technician in various positions in human resources with the South Carolina Army National Guard. He currently spends his time as an investor/partner in several companies and participates on several boards and advisory boards.

References

Living people
First Ladies and Gentlemen of South Carolina
National Guard (United States) officers
United States Army personnel of the War in Afghanistan (2001–2021)
University of North Carolina at Charlotte alumni
Year of birth missing (living people)
South Carolina National Guard personnel